Andravida–Kyllini is a municipality in the Elis regional unit, West Greece region, Greece. The seat of the municipality is the town Lechaina. The municipality has an area of 355.476 km2.

Municipality
The municipality Andravida–Kyllini was formed at the 2011 local government reform by the merger of the following 4 former municipalities, that became municipal units:
Andravida
Kastro-Kyllini
Lechaina
Vouprasia

References

External links

Municipalities of Western Greece
Populated places in Elis